Aba North is a Local Government Area in Aba, Abia State, Nigeria. In the year (1991) Aba North local government was created. The headquarters is at Eziama Uratta. It is amongst the local governments that made up Abia South senatorial zone. It is in South East geopolitical zone. The Igbo ethnic group is predominant in the area. The people of the area are mostly Christians and traditional worshippers with Igbo and English as the commonly spoken languages.

The postal code is 450.

List of Towns and villages in Aba North 
The towns and villages in Aba North include :

 Ogbor
 ụmụ ọla - egbelu
 ụmụ ọla - Okpulor
 Eziama
 Osusu
 Umuokoji 
 uratta.

Economy of Aba North 

Aba North Local government area is home to the popular Ariaria International Market which is one of Africa’s biggest markets.

References

Local Government Areas in Abia State